Sebastián Francisco Javier Montesinos Pezoa (born 12 March 1986) was a Chilean footballer who played as centre back.

His last team was then Primera B side A.C. Barnechea.

References

External links
 
 

1983 births
Living people
Chilean footballers
Chile international footballers
Chile under-20 international footballers
Chilean Primera División players
Primera B de Chile players
Everton de Viña del Mar footballers
Deportes Concepción (Chile) footballers
San Marcos de Arica footballers
Cobreloa footballers
Ñublense footballers
Colo-Colo footballers
A.C. Barnechea footballers
Curicó Unido footballers
C.D. Huachipato footballers
Association football defenders